"Great Times" is a song by American recording artist will.i.am. Produced by will.i.am in collaboration with Freshman III and Damien Leroy, it was released as a single on November 29, 2011 in support of his fourth studio album #willpower (2013). The song, written by will.i.am about his experiences in Brazil, appears on #willpower in remixed form under the new title "Great Times Are Coming".

Background
will.i.am wrote "Great Times" as a dedication to the country of Brazil. The song contains samples of Brazilian musician Jorge Ben Jor's "Taj Mahal". Explaining the inspiration behind "Great Times", will.i.am stated:

Release
An unfinished version of the song initially leaked to the Internet in September 2011, at which will.i.am expressed his dissatisfaction. In a post to the social networking site Twitter, he wrote: "I never wanted that version released. Now I am very angry. Who leaked it? That's not how things should be. Not cool!" "Great Times" served as the first single from #willpower in Brazil, and was released as a digital single in the country on November 29, 2011. To promote the single's release, will.i.am partnered with Anheuser-Busch InBev, who pressed magazine advertisements containing a playable vinyl flexidisc single featuring "Great Times". "Great Times" was later released to Brazilian radio, peaking at number 59 on Billboard Brasil Hot 100 Airplay chart.

Music video
The music video for "Great Times" was shot in the Brazilian cities of Rio de Janeiro and São Paulo. It was released on February 13, 2012 through will.i.am's VEVO channel. The video depicts will.i.am partying and travelling around Brazil. Reviewing the video, a critic for the website Idolator quipped that will.i.am "suggests that we all arrange our bags and we travel to Brazil."

Charts

Release history

References

2011 singles
Will.i.am songs
Song recordings produced by will.i.am
Interscope Records singles
Songs written by Damien LeRoy
Songs written by will.i.am
2011 songs